Bowbeat Hill is a hill in the Moorfoot Hills range, part of the Southern Uplands of Scotland. It lends its name to Bowbeat Onshore Wind Farm built on the hill and commissioned in 2003. The wind farm produces 31.2MW of power using 24 turbines. It is commonly ascended with its neighbouring hills from Gladhouse Reservoir to the north.

References

Donald mountains
Mountains and hills of the Scottish Borders
Mountains and hills of Midlothian
Mountains and hills of the Southern Uplands